Thomas Matthew Bradby (born 13 January 1967) is a British journalist and novelist who currently presents the ITV News at Ten. He was previously political editor for ITV News from 2005 to 2015, and presented The Agenda with Tom Bradby, a political discussion series, from 2012 to 2016.

Early life and education
Bradby's father served in the Royal Navy and as a result he was born in Malta in 1967. He is an only child, and both parents are described by him as exemplary. After a short spell in Gibraltar he moved to Britain. He was privately educated at Westbourne House School and Sherborne School, before studying history at the University of Edinburgh.

Career
Bradby has worked for ITN, producer of ITV News, since 1990 when he joined the organisation as an editorial trainee. He subsequently became producer for ITV's political editor Michael Brunson in 1992.

From 1993 to 1996, Bradby was ITV's Ireland correspondent, reporting on events including the Northern Ireland peace process, the IRA ceasefire and Bill Clinton's visit to Ireland in November 1995. Bradby later became ITV's Asia correspondent from 1999 to 2001. In October 1999, he was injured whilst covering the riots in Jakarta against the newly elected President, Abdurrahman Wahid.

Bradby returned to Britain and began a stint as royal correspondent, covering a number of key stories, including the Golden Jubilee of Queen Elizabeth II, as well as the deaths of Queen Elizabeth the Queen Mother and Princess Margaret. He later became UK editor and then political editor, taking on the role in 2005.

On 16 November 2010, Bradby carried out the first official interview of Prince William and Kate Middleton at St James's Palace after the couple's engagement was announced. It was reported that Bradby was chosen specifically to conduct the interview owing to a long-standing acquaintance with Prince William. He subsequently attended their wedding as a guest. In 2021, it was reported that Prince William had cut Bradby off for "siding with Harry" after the Megxit affair. 
Bradby had worked on a 2016 BBC documentary about Prince Harry's charity work in Lesotho and got to know him fairly intimately.

Bradby has since transitioned from reporter to presenter for a variety of programmes: In February 2012, ITV launched a weekly political discussion programme, The Agenda, hosted by Bradby; in August 2013, Bradby presented an edition of News at Ten for the first time; and in May 2015, he presented ITV's main coverage of the 2015 general election. In October 2015, Bradby took over as the main newscaster of the flagship News at Ten.

In June 2016, Bradby led live coverage of the EU Referendum 2016 for ITV News.

In November 2020, Bradby led through the night coverage of the US presidential election 2020 for ITV News, live from Washington, D.C.

On 17 April 2021, Bradby co-presented ITV's coverage of the funeral of Prince Philip, Duke of Edinburgh with Julie Etchingham.

Bradby's interview with Prince Harry, Harry: The Interview, was broadcast on 8 January 2023 in advance of the publication of Harry's memoir, Spare.

Publications
Bradby has written nine novels:
 Shadow Dancer (1998) 
 The Sleep of the Dead (2001) 
 The Master of Rain (2002) 
 The White Russian (2003) 
 The God of Chaos (2004) 
 Blood Money (2009) 
Secret Service (2019) 
Double Agent (2020) 
Triple Cross (2021) 
Yesterday's Spy (2022) 

Shadow Dancer was adapted by Bradby into a film of the same name starring Clive Owen and Andrea Riseborough in 2012. It premiered at the 2012 Sundance Film Festival.

Bradby wrote the ITV drama The Great Fire, broadcast in 2014.

Personal life
In 1994, Bradby married Claudia, the daughter of vice-admiral Sir Nicholas Hill-Norton. Bradby lives in Hampshire with Claudia, a jewellery designer, and their three children. Bradby stated in 2007 that he is apolitical with no "coherent set of political views". The couple attended in a personal capacity, both of the individual weddings of Prince William and Prince Harry. Kate Middleton (as she was) professionally collaborated with Claudia on a jewellery design.

References

External links 

|-

1967 births
21st-century British novelists
21st-century British male writers
21st-century British screenwriters
Alumni of the University of Edinburgh
British bloggers
British male novelists
British political commentators
British political journalists
British social commentators
ITN newsreaders and journalists
Living people
People educated at Sherborne School
Royal correspondents